The Pennsylvania Railroad's steam locomotive class D1 (formerly Class A, pre-1895) comprised thirteen 4-4-0 locomotives for express passenger service, constructed at the railroad's own Altoona Works (now owned by Norfolk Southern) during 1868–1872.
They were the first standardized class of locomotives on the railroad and shared many parts with other standard classes.

The PRR was the first American railroad to adopt the Westinghouse air brake, the first tests of which were made in September 1869; Class A locomotives were among those fitted with air brake equipment for those earliest tests.

They remained in service until 1945, and were all withdrawn and scrapped by 1946.

References

4-4-0 locomotives
D01
Railway locomotives introduced in 1868
Scrapped locomotives
Standard gauge locomotives of the United States
Steam locomotives of the United States